The Oak Island Golf Club (OIGC) is located in Caswell Beach NC on the south side of Oak Island looking out at the Atlantic Ocean.  Part of the Lower Cape Fear region in Brunswick County, Southeast North Carolina, it is one of the few 18 holes golf courses built on a barrier island. The privately owned 6,720 yard, par 72 course is open to the public and has 37 bunkers with water in play on 11 holes. Laid out with five sets of tees which present a wide range of playability, the back (blue) tees are course rated at 73.1 with a slope of 139.  A pro shop/pub/snack bar along with a full practice facility to include a sand trap, both putting and pitching greens, and a driving range is also available to the public.

History 
The first nine  holes were completed in 1962 while the second nine opened to the public in 1975. The course architect, George Cobb (1914-1986), in addition to being the co-designer of Augusta National's par 3 course, is also the architect for over 100 other courses in the southeast US to include East Lake in Atlanta GA, Quail Hollow in Charlotte NC and Sea Pines in Hilton Head SC. The Oak Island layout features ultra-dwarf TifEagle greens  and Bermuda tees/fairways/rough with Long Leaf Pine, Live Oak and Yaupon Holly trees bordering most every fairway. In December 2017, the  original 1962 clubhouse/restaurant was torn down and a new facility built which opened in December 2019.

Golf Events 
Tournaments are held year round with the most popular ones being a mixed scramble event on Super Bowl Sunday, the Superintendent’s Revenge in late winter where the course is set up with no concern for the rules of golf and pin positions are unbelievably difficult, the Southport-Oak Island Classic captain's choice event sponsored by the local Chamber of Commerce in the spring which includes a "Putt for Green" competition, the annual Battle of the Beaches where all the neighboring communities compete against each other in a team event, the Club Championship in late August which also includes a senior and super-senior competition, and the weekend Member-Guest tournament in October.

Scorecard

Golf Associations 
The Linksters  men's group dates back to 1986 and holds monthly tournaments on Saturdays where individuals and two or four man teams compete in best ball, scramble or total score events.  There is also a match play elimination tournament held during the spring/summer  and a mixed couples putting contest on a Sunday afternoon in September followed by a banquet. The December monthly competition includes a post event luncheon where awards are presented, the highlight of which is the Joe O’Brien Cup (former Town Mayor) presentation to the golfer of the year.

Its counterpart, the Oak Island Women’s Golf Association (OIWGA)  is an equally active group that conducts year-round weekday (Wednesday) and weekend (Saturday) morning competitions. Tournaments held  during the year include  the mixed couple Sadie Hawkins Day contest in March, the  Member-Member team event in April and the two day Women’s Championship Stroke Play competition in September.  A combined Linkster/OIGWA  team event is held in October while the final event of the year in December is followed by an awards luncheon.

Course Environs
Carved out of a maritime forest, the course is built through four residential communities:  single family homes in Oak Island Estates bordering holes 10-16; another single family development, the Arboretum 
located between holes 1–2 and 16–18; the Ocean Greens mixed townhouse, condo and duplex community surrounding holes 3-7; and Caswell Dunes, a mixed condo and patio home development alongside holes 5-9.

References

External links
 

Golf clubs and courses in North Carolina
1962 establishments in North Carolina
Sports venues completed in 1962
Buildings and structures in Brunswick County, North Carolina